The winners of the 2019 IndieWire Critics Poll were announced on December 16, 2019.

Winners and nominees

References

Indiewire Critics' Poll
Indiewire Critics' Poll